Kaoklai Kaennorsing (born September 13, 1983) is a former Thai light heavyweight Muay Thai fighter. Kaennorsing is the K-1 World Grand Prix 2004 in Seoul tournament winner, former two-division Rajadamnern Stadium champion, and former WBC Muay Thai Light Heavyweight Champion. 

At the time of his K-1 debut, on July 17, 2004 in Seoul, Kaoklai weighted , the lightest and youngest fighter ever to win a K-1 Openweight tournament. His name Kaoklai means in Thai "to have a good future". 

Kaoklai is currently an instructor of Muay Thai at Evolve MMA in Singapore.

Biography

Early life
Kaoklai Kaennorsing was born as Athit DamKam in the heart of Northeastern Thailand, in the city of Khon Kaen. He became a student of Jockey Gym and he started training Muay Thai at the young age of eight. He had his first fight a year later which he lost by points decision. After graduation of junior high school for 3 years, he devoted himself to train Muay Thai.

Winning Rajadamnern Stadium titles
On March 31, 2001, Kaoklai fought against Kozo Takeda in Japan. Takeda just won the title of Rajadamnern Stadium at welterweight on January 21. Kaoklai knocked down Takeda with right middle kick to his temple at 1R, but he started getting damaged with right low kicks.  Takeda knocked down Kaoklai with right low kick during 3R, and Kaoklai lost by the unanimous decision at 5R.

In September 2002, at the age of 19, Kaoklai fought against Charnvit Kiat T.B.Ubol for the vacant title of Rajadamnern Stadium championship at welterweight. Kaoklai won by decision at 5R, and he won one of the most prestigious belts in Muay Thai. Although Kaokalai defeat Charnvit before, he failed to defend his title from the same fighter in 2002, and he lost his first title.

On December 13, he participated the championship against Chalermsak Chuwatthana for the vacant title of Rajadamnern Stadium at Super welterweight. He won by the unanimous decision, and succeeded to win the titles at two different weight division.

In 2003, Kaoklai fought against Yokkao Borchorror2 to defend his title, but he lost by unanimous decision, and lost his title again.

On October 20, 2002, Kaoklai fought against Toshio Matsumoto in Japan, but he lost by the unanimous decision at 5R. After this bout, the Thai promoter protested and asserted that the judges did not consider Kaoklai's technics of neck wrestling, clinching and knee strikes. In result, this bout was decided as no contest and Shinichi Ihara, the president of SNKA, announced that SNKA is going to promote rematch in Thailand. Later, the rematch was canceled, and it was promoted next year in Japan.

On March 30, 2003, Kaoklai fought against Lamsongkram Sauna-Harnjawe currently known as Lamsongkram Chuwattana. He won by TKO.

On October 12, Kaoklai had a rematch against Toshio Matsumoto in Japan. During 1R, he knocked down Matsumoto with right cross, but he was knocked out with punches at 2R
.

Winning K-1 Asia GP 2004
Kaoklai made his K-1 debut on July 17, 2004 at the Asian qualification Grand Prix, held in Seoul, Korea. He started the night with a quick right punch knockout win over Denis Kang in the quarterfinals. In the semis, he met Tsuyoshi Nakasako from Japan and earned a unanimous decision victory, sending him to the finals against Shingo Koyasu. Kaoklai won the evenly fought battle in the extra round, collected 60 million ₩ and advanced to K-1 World GP 2004 Final Elimination, held in Nippon Budokan Arena, Tokyo, Japan .

His opponent at the Final Elimination was Belarusian kickboxer Alexey Ignashov. Having to overcome  weight and 8 in height disadvantage Kaoklai's quick, hit-and-run strategy started to paying off at the end of second round. Ignashov was issued two yellow cards for inactiveness throughout the fight, and the judges scored the fight after one extra round by a split decision in Kaoklai's favor. Kaoklai is being called "Matrix defense" because his defense skills looked like Neo from the movie of The Matrix.

On December 4, 2004, Kaoklai was the youngest and the lightest fighter ever to compete in the 12th annual K-1 World GP Championships, held in Tokyo Dome, Japan. Kaoklai started the fight cautiously circling the American, tossing in hard low kicks. At the end of the first round Kaoklai landed a lightning-quick jumping right high kick which connected flush to the head of Mo sending him unconscious to the canvas. This KO win over MO would not only send Kaoklai to the semifinals but earn him the nickname "Giant Killer". His amazing run in K-1 Finals came to an end however against Musashi by a closely contested extra round unanimous decision.

On March 19, 2005, Kaoklai entered the Korean World GP as a defending champion. Choi more than doubled Kaoklai's weight and towering a 1'3" (0.38 m) above the defending champion. Kaoklai was unable to overcome the disadvantage this time and lost the fight by unanimous decision after an extra round. After this loss, Kaoklai started suffering more losses than wins.

On December 18, 2005, Kaoklai participated local event of SNKA in Yamanashi to fight against Moroccan kickboxer "Prince" Hamid Boujaoub who live in Australia. He won by the unanimous decision with 30-26.

On February 9, 2006, Kaolai challenged Lamsongkram Chuwattana for his Rajadamnern Stadium at Middleweight. He was in the lead from the start until 3R, but he suddenly lost his stamina during 4R. In result, Lamsongkram came from behind and won the bout because he made up his score at 4R and 5R.

Winning world titles
On June 20, 2008, Kaoklai participated kickboxing event in Jamaica to fight against Clifton Brown from Canada for the vacant title of IKKC Muay Thai World Cruiserweight Championship. Kaoklai won by the split decision after 5R, and won the first world title in his career even if it was nameless title.

Kaoklai was rated as #7 at Light heavyweight of WBC Muay Thai in 2010. On March 14, 2010, Kaoklai fought against Magnum Sakai who was rated as #16 from Japan for the vacant title of WBC Muay Thai World Light heavyweight championship in El Monte, California, United States. Kaoklai knocked down Sakai twice with left hook and left elbow strike at 2R, and knocked out Sakai with right elbow strike at 3R.

Kaoklai was expected to rematch Simon Marcus at Muaythai Superfight on May 13, 2013 and was replaced by Suriya Prasarthinphimai.

Kaoklai has not fought since December 31, 2012.

Titles
 WBC Muaythai
 2010 WBC Muaythai Light Heavyweight (175 lbs) World Champion

 International Karate Kickboxing Council (IKKC) 
 2008 IKKC Muay Thai World Cruiserweight (200 lbs) Champion

 K-1 
 2007 K-1 Rules Heavyweight Tournament in Turkey Runner Up
 2005 K-1 World Grand Prix in Seoul Runner Up
 2004 K-1 World Grand Prix Final 3rd Place
 2004 K-1 World Grand Prix in Seoul Champion

 Rajadamnern Stadium
 2003 Rajadamnern Stadium Super Welterweight (154 lbs) Champion
 2002 Rajadamnern Stadium Welterweight (147 lbs) Champion.

Kickboxing record 

|-
|-  bgcolor="#FFBBBB"
| 2012-12-31 || Loss ||align=left| Fang Bian || Wu Lin Feng || Henan, China || Decision || 3 || 3:00
|-  style="background:"
|-  bgcolor="#FFBBBB"
| 2012-03-16 || Loss ||align=left| Simon Marcus || Suk Wan Muaythai Naikhanomtom || Bangkok, Thailand || Decision (unanimous) || 5 || 3:00
|-
! style=background:white colspan=9 |
|-
|-  bgcolor="#FFBBBB"
| 2011-10-21 || Loss ||align=left| Joe Schilling || M-One "Team Thailand vs. Team America" || Los Angeles, California, USA || TKO (Referee Stoppage) || 1 || 2:43
|-
! style=background:white colspan=9 |
|-
|-  bgcolor="#CCFFCC"
| 2011-10-08 || Win ||align=left| Roberto Cocco || Muaythai Premier League: Round 2 || Padua, Italy || Decision (Unanimous)  || 5 || 3:00
|-
|-  bgcolor="#FFBBBB"
| 2011-09-15 || Loss ||align=left| Aotegen Bateer || Fist of legend-International tournament fight || Shandong, China || Decision || 3 || 3:00
|-
|-  bgcolor="#CCFFCC"
| 2011-07-23 || Win ||align=left| Cyrus Washington || Thailand Versus Challenger Series 2011 || Bangkok, Thailand || TKO (Referee Stoppage) || 3 ||
|-
|-  bgcolor="#FFBBBB"
| 2011-06-18 || Loss ||align=left| Ivan Pentka || China Fight Night || China || Decision || 3 || 3:00
|-
|-  bgcolor="#FFBBBB"
| 2011-02-23 || Loss ||align=left| Artem Levin || Martial Arts Festival "For Russia" || Chelyabinsk, Russia || Decision || 5 || 3:00
|-
! style=background:white colspan=9 |
|-
|-  bgcolor="#CCFFCC"
| 2010-11-14 || Win ||align=left| Marco Aschenbrenner || Thailand vs Challenger series "Thailand vs Germany" || Ulm, Germany || TKO (Referee Stoppage)|| 1 || 3:00
|-
|-  bgcolor="#CCFFCC"
| 2010-08-21 || Win ||align=left| Manu N'toh || WCK Full Rules Muaythai Championship Event || Haikou, China || Decision (Unanimous) || 5 ||  3:00
|-  bgcolor="#CCFFCC"
| 2010-06-04 || Win ||align=left| Aurelien Duarte || Muaythaitv Trophy et Ultimate Thai 5 || Paris, France || KO (Right Overhand) || 1 ||
|-  bgcolor="#CCFFCC"
| 2010-03-14 || Win ||align=left| Magnum Sakai || MTAA Muaythai Extravaganza || El Monte, California, United States || KO (Left Elbow Strike) || 3 || 1:20
|-
! style=background:white colspan=9 |
|-
|-  bgcolor="#CCFFCC"
| 2010-01-16 || Win ||align=left| Erik Kosztanko || Thailand vs Challenger Series, Royal Paragon Hall || Bangkok, Thailand || Decision || 5 || 3:00
|-  bgcolor="#FFBBBB"
| 2009-12-19 || Loss ||align=left| Bian Maofu || Chinese Kung Fu vs Muaythai, Lingnan Pearl Stadium || Foshan, China || Decision || 5 || 3:00
|-  bgcolor="#FFBBBB"
| 2009-11-27 || Loss ||align=left| Hyun-Man Myung || The Khan 2 || Seoul, South Korea || Decision (Unanimous) || 3 || 3:00
|-  bgcolor="#FFBBBB"
| 2009-10-16 || Loss ||align=left| Emil Zoraj || Return of the Gladiators || Brno, Czech Republic || Decision (Unanimous) || 3 || 3:00
|-  bgcolor="#FFBBBB"
| 2009-06-26 || Loss ||align=left| Clifton Brown || CCGI's "Champion of Champions 2" || Montego Bay, Jamaica || Decision (Unanimous) || 5 || 3:00
|-
! style=background:white colspan=9 |
|-
|-  bgcolor="#CCFFCC"
| 2008-06-20 || Win ||align=left| Clifton Brown || WCK: World Championship Muay Thai "Champions of Champions" || Montego Bay, Jamaica || Decision (Split) || 5 || 3:00
|-
! style=background:white colspan=9 |
|-
|-  bgcolor="#FFBBBB"
| 2008-03-30 || Loss ||align=left| Francois Botha || The Khan 1 || Seoul, South Korea || Decision || 3 || 3:00
|-  bgcolor="#c5d2ea"
| 2008-03-08 || Draw ||align=left| Khalid Bourdif || Fight Night in Düsseldorf || Düsseldorf, Germany || Decision || 5 || 3:00
|-  bgcolor="#CCFFCC"
| 2008-01-18 || Win ||align=left| Seoung-Hun Kim || FG Fighting Championship 2008 || Seoul, South Korea || Decision || 3 || 3:00
|-  bgcolor="#CCFFCC"
| 2007-10-16 || Win ||align=left| Yong-Soo Choi ||  || Seoul, South Korea || Decision || 3 || 3:00
|-  bgcolor="#FFBBBB"
| 2007-06-22 || Loss ||align=left| Nathan Corbett || Xplosion 10 || Gold Coast, Australia || KO || 2 || 2:48
|-  bgcolor="#FFBBBB"
| 2007-05-06 || Loss ||align=left| Vincent Vielvoye || SLAMM "Nederland vs Thailand III" || Haarlem, Netherlands || Decision (Unanimous) || 5 || 3:00
|-  bgcolor="#CCFFCC"
| 2007-02-18 || Win ||align=left| Yong Soo Park || K-1 Fighting Network KHAN 2007 in Seoul || Seoul, South Korea || Decision (Unanimous) || 4(Ex.1) || 3:00
|-  bgcolor="#FFBBBB"
| 2007-01-13 || Loss ||align=left| Magomed Magomedov || K-1 Rules Heavyweight Tournament 2007 in Turkey Final || Istanbul, Turkey || KO (Knee Strike) || 1 || 2:59
|-
! style=background:white colspan=9 |
|-
|-  bgcolor="#CCFFCC"
| 2007-01-13 || Win ||align=left| Azem Maksutaj || K-1 Rules Heavyweight Tournament 2007 in Turkey  Semi-final || Istanbul, Turkey || Decision (Unanimous) || 4(Ex.1) || 3:00
|-  bgcolor="#FFBBBB"
| 2006-10-01 || Loss ||align=left| Tyrone Spong || SLAMM "Nederland vs Thailand II" || Almere, Netherlands || KO (Right Overhand) || 1 || 1:56
|-  bgcolor="#FFBBBB"
| 2006-06-03 || Loss ||align=left| Tsuyoshi Nakasako || K-1 World Grand Prix 2006 in Seoul Quarter-final || Seoul, South Korea || Decision (Unanimous) || 3 || 3:00
|-  bgcolor="#c5d2ea"
| 2006-04-28 || Draw ||align=left| Hiromi Amada || SNKA Titans 3rd || Shibuya, Tokyo, Japan || Decision || 3 || 3:00
|-  bgcolor="#FFBBBB"
| 2006-02-09 || Loss ||align=left| Lamsongkram Chuwattana || Rajadamnern Stadium || Bangkok, Thailand || Decision (Unanimous) || 5 || 3:00
|-
! style=background:white colspan=9 |
|-
|-  bgcolor="#CCFFCC"
| 2005-12-18 || Win ||align=left| Hamid Boujaoub || SNKA "Kōfu Event -Miyagawa Dojo Final 2005-" || Kōfu, Yamanashi, Japan || Decision (Unanimous) || 3 || 3:00
|-  bgcolor="#FFBBBB"
| 2005-10-12 || Loss ||align=left| Yoshihiro Sato || K-1 World MAX 2005 Champions' Challenge || Shibuya, Tokyo, Japan || Decision (Majority) || 3 || 3:00
|-  bgcolor="#FFBBBB"
| 2005-09-23 || Loss ||align=left| Ray Sefo || K-1 World Grand Prix 2005 in Osaka - Final Elimination || Osaka, Osaka, Japan || Decision (Unanimous) || 3 || 3:00
|-  bgcolor="#CCFFCC"
| 2005-08-22 || Win ||align=left| Tsuyoshi Nakasako || SNKA "Titans 2nd" || Shibuya, Tokyo, Japan || Decision (Unanimous) || 3 || 3:00
|-  bgcolor="#FFBBBB"
| 2005-03-19 || Loss ||align=left| Hong-Man Choi  || K-1 World Grand Prix 2005 in Seoul Final || Seoul, South Korea || Decision (Unanimous) || 4(Ex.1) || 3:00
|-
! style=background:white colspan=9 |
|-
|-  bgcolor="#CCFFCC"
| 2005-03-19 || Win ||align=left| Hiraku Hori || K-1 World Grand Prix 2005 in Seoul Semi-final || Seoul, South Korea || Decision (Unanimous) || 3 || 3:00
|-  bgcolor="#CCFFCC"
| 2005-03-19 || Win ||align=left| Zhang Qingjun || K-1 World Grand Prix 2005 in Seoul Quarter-final || Seoul, South Korea || Decision (Unanimous) || 3 || 3:00
|-  bgcolor="#FFBBBB"
| 2004-12-04 || Loss ||align=left| Musashi || K-1 World Grand Prix 2004 Semi-final || Bunkyo, Tokyo, Japan || Decision (Unanimous) || 4(Ex.1) || 3:00
|-  bgcolor="#CCFFCC"
| 2004-12-04 || Win ||align=left| Mighty Mo || K-1 World Grand Prix 2004 Quarter-final || Bunkyo, Tokyo, Japan || KO (Right High Kick) || 1 || 2:40
|-  bgcolor="#c5d2ea"
| 2004-11-06 || Draw ||align=left| Mike Bernardo || SNKA & K-1 "Titans 1st" || Kitakyūshū, Fukuoka, Japan || Decision (1-0) || 3 || 3:00
|-  bgcolor="#CCFFCC"
| 2004-09-25 || Win ||align=left| Alexey Ignashov || K-1 World Grand Prix 2004 Final Elimination || Chiyoda, Tokyo, Japan || Decision (Split) || 4(Ex.1) || 3:00
|-  bgcolor="#CCFFCC"
| 2004-07-17 || Win ||align=left| Shingo Koyasu || K-1 World Grand Prix 2004 in Seoul Final || Seoul, Korea || Decision (Unanimous) || 5(Ex.2) || 3:00
|-
! style=background:white colspan=9 |
|-
|-  bgcolor="#CCFFCC"
| 2004-07-17 || Win ||align=left| Tsuyoshi Nakasako || K-1 World Grand Prix 2004 in Seoul Semi-final || Seoul, Korea || Decision (Majority) || 3 || 3:00
|-  bgcolor="#CCFFCC"
| 2004-07-17 || Win ||align=left| Denis Kang || K-1 World Grand Prix 2004 in Seoul Quarter-final || Seoul, Korea || KO (Right Hook) || 1 || 1:48
|-  bgcolor="#CCFFCC"
| 2004-05-21 || Win ||align=left| Aaron Boyes || Ocean City Promotion || New Zealand || Decision || 5 || 3:00
|-  bgcolor="#FFBBBB"
| 2004-05-17 || Loss ||align=left| Yokkao BorChorRor2 || Daorungchujarean Fights, Rajadamnern Stadium || Bangkok, Thailand || Decision || 5 || 3:00
|-  bgcolor="#CCFFCC"
| 2004-03-11 || Win ||align=left| Taweesap Petchphutong || Rajadamnern Stadium || Bangkok, Thailand || KO || 5 || 3:00
|-  bgcolor="#FFBBBB"
| 2004-02-01 || Loss ||align=left| Changpuek Chor.Siprasert || Petchmahanak Fights, Rajadamnern Stadium || Bangkok, Thailand || TKO || 2 ||
|-  bgcolor="#CCFFCC"
| 2004-01-01 || Win ||align=left| Saisilak Tor.Charnthunyakarn || SUK Daorungchujarean+Charumuean, Rajadamnern Stadium || Bangkok, Thailand || Decision || 5 || 3:00
|-  bgcolor="#CCFFCC"
| 2003-12-03 || Win ||align=left| Chalermsak Chuwatthana || SUK Yodmuay UBC, Nakormpathom Stadium || Nakhon Pathom, Thailand || Decision || 5 || 3:00
|-  bgcolor="#FFBBBB"
| 2003-10-12 || Loss ||align=left| Toshio Matsumoto || SNKA "Magnum 3" || Bunkyō, Tokyo, Japan || KO (Punches) || 2 || 1:09
|-  bgcolor="#FFBBBB"
| 2003 || Loss ||align=left| Yokkao BorChorRor2 || Rajadamnern Stadium || Bangkok, Thailand || Decision || 5 || 3:00
|-
! style=background:white colspan=9 |
|-
|-  bgcolor="#CCFFCC"
| 2003-05-26 || Win ||align=left| Zakaria Faisal || Rajadamnern Stadium || Bangkok, Thailand || Decision || 5 || 3:00
|-  bgcolor="#FFBBBB"
| 2003-04-30 || Loss ||align=left| Saketdaw KT Gym || Rajadamnern Stadium || Bangkok, Thailand || 	Decision (Unanimous) || 5 || 3:00
|-  bgcolor="#CCFFCC"
| 2003-03-30 || Win ||align=left| Lamsongkram Sauna-Harnjawe || Rajadamnern Stadium || Bangkok, Thailand || TKO || 3 ||
|-  bgcolor="#CCFFCC"
| 2002-12-13 || Win ||align=left| Chalermsak Chuwatthana || SUK Yodmuaylok Kratingdaeng || Bangkok, Thailand || Decision || 5 || 3:00
|-
! style=background:white colspan=9 |
|-
|-  bgcolor="#FFBBBB"
| 2002 || Loss ||align=left| Charnvit Kiat Tor.Bor.Ubon || Rajadamnern Stadium || Bangkok, Thailand || Decision || 5 || 3:00
|-
! style=background:white colspan=9 |
|-
|-  bgcolor="#c5d2ea"
| 2002-10-20 || NC ||align=left| Toshio Matsumoto || SNKA "Road To Muay-Thai 2002" || Bangkok, Thailand || Decision (Unanimous) || 5 || 3:00
|-
! style=background:white colspan=9 |
|-
|-  bgcolor="#CCFFCC"
| 2002-09 || Win ||align=left| Charnvit Kiat Tor.Bor.Ubon || Rajadamnern Stadium || Bangkok, Thailand || Decision || 5 || 3:00
|-
! style=background:white colspan=9 |
|-
|-  bgcolor="#FFBBBB"
| 2001-03-31 || Loss ||align=left| Kozo Takeda || SNKA "Real Champion Appearance" || Bunkyō, Tokyo, Japan || Decision (Unanimous) || 5 || 3:00
|-  bgcolor="#CCFFCC"
| 2000-04-09 || Win ||align=left| Susumu Daigūji || Rajadamnern Stadium || Bangkok, Thailand || Decision || 5 || 3:00
|-  bgcolor="#CCFFCC"
| 2000-03-09 || Win ||align=left| Thapjakrin Tansalingkran || Rajadamnern Stadium || Bangkok, Thailand || Decision || 5 || 3:00

|-  bgcolor="#CCFFCC"
| 2004-04-06 || Win ||align=left| Hiroyuki Yoshino || Bunkyō, Tokyo, Japan || Decision (Majority) || 10 || 3:00
|-  bgcolor="#FFBBBB"
| 2003-09-05 || Loss ||align=left| Takashi Fushiki || Osaka, Osaka, Japan || Technical Decision (Majority) || 4 || 0:45
|-  bgcolor="#FFBBBB"
| 2003-03-10 || Loss ||align=left| Hwan-Young Park || Seoul, South Korea || KO || 4 || 2:08
|-
! style=background:white colspan=9 |
|-
|-  bgcolor="#FFBBBB"
| 2002-07-29 || Loss ||align=left| Naotaka Hozumi || Bunkyō, Tokyo, Japan || KO || 4 || 2:10
|-  bgcolor="#FFBBBB"
| 2002-05-28 || Loss ||align=left| Yoshihiro Araki || Osaka, Osaka, Japan || KO || 2 || 2:47
|-  bgcolor="#FFBBBB"
| 2002-02-11 || Loss ||align=left| Kenji Satō || Bunkyō, Tokyo, Japan || KO || 3 || 1:58
|-  bgcolor="#FFBBBB"
| 2001-08-16 || Loss ||align=left| Shunsuke Itō　(Shun Morita) || Bunkyō, Tokyo, Japan || KO || 2 || 1:38
|-
| colspan=9 | Legend:

Trivia
Kaoklai has fought against Chalermsak Chuwatthana 9 times, with Kaoklai picking up 4 wins and 5 losses

See also
List of male kickboxers
List of K-1 events

References

External links

K-1 Official Website

1983 births
Living people
Welterweight kickboxers
Middleweight kickboxers
Light heavyweight kickboxers
Cruiserweight kickboxers
Kaoklai Kaennorsing
Kaoklai Kaennorsing